Daniel Evgenyevich Shilkov (born September 25, 1982 in the Sverdlovsk Oblast) is a Russian politician, a deputy of the 7th State Duma of the Russian Federation.

Biography

Education
Shilkov studied arts education at Ural State Technical University, graduating in 2004. He also studied economic theory at Ural Federal University in 2016.

State Duma of the Russian Federation
In 2016, Shilkov was elected as a deputy in the State Duma, the lower house of the Federal Assembly of Russia. He is a representative for the Sverdlovsk region. His first day in office was September 18, 2016. He is a member of the State Duma Committee on Financial Markets, and is also deputy chairman of the committee that is responsible to ensure accuracy of the financial and property disclosures submitted by deputies.

Shilkov and fellow LDPR deputy Vitaly Pashin presented a bill in support of animal rights to the State Duma on December 1, 2016. If passed into law, the bill would create a national animal ombudsman to protect the interests of both domestic and wild animals in Russia.

References 

Living people
Liberal Democratic Party of Russia politicians
Seventh convocation members of the State Duma (Russian Federation)
21st-century Russian politicians
1982 births